Elijah Woods may refer to:

 Elijah Woods (politician) (1778–1820), Ohio politician
 Elijah Woods, half of Canadian electropop duo Elijah Woods x Jamie Fine

See also
 Elijah Wood (born 1981), American actor